The 2021 County Championship (referred to as the LV= Insurance County Championship for sponsorship reasons) was the 121st cricket County Championship season in England and Wales. For the first phase of the tournament, the teams were split into three groups of six, with each side playing ten matches. The top two teams from each group progressed into Division One for the second phase of the competition, with the other teams progressing to Divisions Two and Three. The team that finished top of Division One became the county champions; and the top two teams from Division One contested a five-day match at Lord's for the Bob Willis Trophy. On 17 December 2020, the England and Wales Cricket Board (ECB) confirmed all the fixtures for the tournament. After completion of the group stage on 14 July 2021, the ECB confirmed the fixtures for the division stage on 22 July 2021. 

In July 2021, in  Lancashire's match against Kent, James Anderson took his 1,000th first-class wicket. In September 2021, Tom Haines became the first batsman to score 1,000 runs in this edition of the Championship.

For their final match in Group 3, Kent were forced to replace their entire side for their match against Sussex, after a positive test for COVID-19 in their first XI. On the second day of Kent's match, Nathan Gilchrist was forced to withdraw from the game, after being told to self-isolate. The final Group 1 match between Derbyshire and Essex was called off prior to the start of the second day, after a member of Derbyshire's team tested positive for COVID-19. The ECB confirmed that the result of the match would be treated as a draw. On 28 August 2021, the ECB announced that the Division 2 match between Durham and Surrey had been cancelled, after a member of the Surrey team had tested positive for COVID-19.

Warwickshire won the Division One group to win their first County Championship title since 2012, with Lancashire finishing in second place. Warwickshire won the five-day match against Lancashire, to become the second winners of the Bob Willis Trophy. The Division Two title was won by Essex, with Kent winning the Division Three title.

Teams
The following teams took part in the County Championship:

Group stage

Teams
The teams were placed into the following groups for the Group Stage:

 Group 1: Derbyshire, Durham, Essex, Nottinghamshire, Warwickshire, Worcestershire
 Group 2: Gloucestershire, Hampshire, Leicestershire, Middlesex, Somerset, Surrey
 Group 3: Glamorgan, Kent, Lancashire, Northamptonshire, Sussex, Yorkshire

Fixtures

Group 1

Group 2

Group 3

Standings
Teams receive 16 points for a win and 8 for a draw or tie. Bonus points (a maximum of 5 batting points and 3 bowling points) could be scored during the first 110 overs of each team's first innings.

Group 1

Group 2

Group 3

Qualification

Teams
The teams qualified into the following divisions for the Division Stage:

 Division One: Hampshire, Lancashire, Nottinghamshire, Somerset, Warwickshire, Yorkshire
 Division Two: Durham, Essex, Glamorgan, Gloucestershire, Northamptonshire, Surrey
 Division Three: Derbyshire, Kent, Leicestershire, Middlesex, Sussex, Worcestershire

Points carried forward
Each county played four games in the Division stage. They did not play against the team in their Division that was in their Group for the Group Stage. Instead, they carried forward into the Division stage half the total points they scored in the two matches played against that team in the group stage, that is, the average points they scored from their two matches against that opponent.

Division stage

Fixtures
Source:

Division One

Division Two

Division Three

Standings

Division One

Division Two

Division Three

Bob Willis Trophy
Warwickshire and Lancashire finished first and second of County Championship Division One respectively, to play for the Bob Willis Trophy at Lord's.

References

External links
 County Championship at ESPN Cricinfo
 Bob Willis Trophy at ESPN Cricinfo

2021
County Championship